Maurice T. Drayton (born October 5, 1976) is an American football coach and former player who is currently the head coach of The Citadel Bulldogs. He has previously coached the Charleston Swamp Foxes, Seinajoki Crocodiles, Goose Creek High School, South Carolina State Bulldogs, Coastal Carolina Chanticleers, Southern Miss Golden Eagles, Montreal Alouettes, Indianapolis Colts, Green Bay Packers, and Las Vegas Raiders.

Early life and education
Maurice Drayton was born on October 5, 1976, in Charleston, South Carolina. He attended Berkeley High School, graduating in 1994. He later accepted a scholarship offer from The Citadel. In five seasons with the school, Drayton compiled 145 tackles, 17 passes defensed and three interceptions. He earned varsity letters in his final three years with the team.

Coaching career

The Citadel
After going unselected in the 1999 NFL Draft, Drayton started a coaching career with his alma mater, The Citadel. He served as a graduate assistant and secondary coach during 1999, before becoming tight ends and offensive tackles coach in 2000. He shifted to wide receivers coach in 2001, outside linebackers in 2002, and secondary/special teams coach/recruiting coordinator from 2003 to 2005.

Charleston Swamp Foxes
While serving as a position coach at The Citadel, Drayton also coached the wide receivers for the Charleston Swamp Foxes of AF2 from 2000 to 2002.

Seinajoki Crocodiles and Goose Creek High School
In 2006, Drayton served as a defensive coordinator in the European Football League (EFL) with the Seinajoki Crocodiles in Finland. He returned to the United States in 2007 as an assistant coach and administrator for Goose Creek High School.

South Carolina State
From 2008 to 2009, Drayton coached the special teams and defensive backs at South Carolina State University. While he was there, they won two conference championships and twice made the NCAA playoffs. In 2009, the team was ranked number 7 in the nation for pass defense in number 5 in total defense. They won a national championship in 2009.

Coastal Carolina
Drayton left South Carolina State in 2010 to join the Coastal Carolina Chanticleers. He was with the team from 2010 to 2011, serving as special teams, wide receivers, and assistant head coach. He helped them achieve their first conference title since 2006 and had two receivers earn all-conference honors.

Southern Miss
He served as secondary coach of the Southern Miss Golden Eagles in 2012. Defensive back Kalan Reed, who went on to play several seasons in the National Football League (NFL), recorded 21 tackles and a interception return touchdown as a true freshman under Drayton.

Montreal Alouettes

The Citadel (second stint)
Drayton returned to his alma mater of The Citadel in 2014, serving as assistant head coach, defensive coordinator, and cornerbacks coach in two seasons. He helped The Citadel earn several records in 2015, with the team winning six conference games and nine total. Their defense that year was second in scoring defense, total defense, rushing defense, and sacks. They also led their conference with 31 takeaways, just ten total touchdown passes allowed, a 36.5 third-down conversion percentage and 11 fumble recoveries. The secondary also recorded five interceptions returned for touchdowns, most in the FCS. Defensive lineman Mitchell Jeter was named conference defensive player of the year and two players earned All-America honors.

Indianapolis Colts
He helped Pat McAfee earn Pro Bowl honors in 2016 and punter Rigoberto Sanchez earn a position on the all-rookie team the following year. Placekicker Adam Vinatieri recorded two 100-point seasons, extending his record to twenty seasons achieving that mark.

Green Bay Packers
He was their assistant special teams coach from 2018 to 2020, before being promoted to special teams coordinator in 2021. The Packers’ special teams was consistently one of the worst units throughout the 2021 season as they were ranked 32nd in the NFL by the Football Outsiders DVOA, Packer Central, and Sports Illustrated writer Rick Gosselin.

During the 2021–22 NFL playoffs, Drayton came under scrutiny after the special teams unit struggled throughout the game against the San Francisco 49ers in the Divisional Round, most notably allowing a blocked punt returned for a game tying touchdown in the fourth quarter, having a field goal blocked at the end of the second quarter, and having just 10 players on the field during Robbie Gould's game winning field goal during the 13–10 loss, despite taking a timeout just prior to the kick.

Drayton was fired from his position on February 1, 2022.

Las Vegas Raiders
On March 2, 2022, it was announced that Drayton was hired by the Las Vegas Raiders as assistant special teams coach.

The Citadel (third stint) 
Drayton accepted the head coaching role at The Citadel in December 2022.

References

External links
 The Citadel profile

1976 births
Living people
American football cornerbacks
Coastal Carolina Chanticleers football coaches
Green Bay Packers coaches
Indianapolis Colts coaches
Las Vegas Raiders coaches
Montreal Alouettes coaches
South Carolina State Bulldogs football coaches
Southern Miss Golden Eagles football coaches
The Citadel Bulldogs football coaches
The Citadel Bulldogs football players
High school football coaches in South Carolina
People from Moncks Corner, South Carolina
Coaches of American football from South Carolina
Players of American football from South Carolina
African-American coaches of American football
African-American players of American football
20th-century African-American sportspeople
21st-century African-American sportspeople